Josep Maria Forn i Costa (April 4, 1928 – October 3, 2021) was a Spanish actor, film producer and film director.

He was born in Barcelona, and began making movies in the 1950s with the short-film Gaudí (1954) and some commercial movies. His film, La piel quemada (Burnt Skin) (1967), dealt with the migration to Catalonia from other parts of Spain, and was very successful besides the Franco's censorship.

In 1975, he became the founder and president of Institut de Cinema Català. From 1987 to 1991, he was the director of the  cinematography department in the Generalitat de Catalunya, and in 1994, president of Catalan Film Directors College.

He received the Creu de Sant Jordi Award by the Catalan Government in 2001.

Filmography

Director 
 1957: Yo maté
 1959: Muerte al amanecer 
 1960: La vida privada de Fulano de Tal 
 1960: La rana verde
 1961: ¿Pena de muerte?
 1962: La ruta de los narcóticos
 1962: Los culpables
 1963: José María
 1964: La barca sin pescador
 1967: La piel quemada
 1975: La respuesta
 1979: Companys, procés a Catalunya
 1991: Ho sap el ministre? 
 1998: Subjúdice
 2006: El coronel Macià

Actor 
 1978: La ràbia
 1978: Serenata a la claror de la lluna 
 1979: Alicia en la España de las maravillas 
 1980: La campanada
 1981: Un drac, Sant Jordi i el cavaller Kaskarlata
 1982: Puny clos
 1983: Como un adiós
 1985: Un, dos, tres... ensaïmades i res més

References

External links 
 

1928 births
2021 deaths
Male film actors from Catalonia
Film directors from Catalonia
Spanish film producers
Spanish male film actors
Male actors from Barcelona